Galt is the surname of:

People
 Alexander Tilloch Galt (1817–1893), politician and a major figure in the Canadian Confederation
 Edith Galt (1872–1961), second wife of President Woodrow Wilson
 Elliott Torrance Galt (1850–1928), Canadian businessman and developer
 Jimmy Galt (1885–1935), Scottish footballer
 John Galt (novelist) (1779–1839), Scottish writer, entrepreneur, political commentator and founder of Guelph, Ontario
 Malcolm Patrick Galt (1929-2022), Roman Catholic bishop of the diocese of Bridgetown, Barbados
 Maud Galt (1620–1670), lesbian accused of witchcraft in Scotland
 Thomas Galt (1805–1857), American Presbyterian minister, abolitionist and a leader of the Illinois Anti-Slavery Society
 William Wylie Galt (1919-1945), United States Army officer and recipient of the Congressional Medal of Honor
 William W. Galt (Minnesota politician) (1854-1945), American farmer and politician
 Tögöldur Galt (born 1995), Mongolian footballer
 Wylie Galt (born 1984), American politician

Fictional characters
 John Galt, hero of Ayn Rand's novel Atlas Shrugged
 Arthur Galt, an antagonist from the 1982 action film First Blood